John Joseph "Bill" Lewis (3 September 1909 – 3 August 1949) was an Australian rules footballer who played with North Melbourne in the Victorian Football League (VFL).

Family
The son of Joseph Lewis, and Mary Agnes Lewis, née Lewis, John Joseph Lewis was born at Carlton, Victoria on 3 September 1909.

His brother, John Francis "Johnny" Lewis (1901–1973), played VFA and VFL football for North Melbourne, and VFL football for Melbourne.

He married Nellie May Ottaway (1912–1986) in 1940.

Death
He died (of a "natural cerebral haemorrhage) on 3 August 1949 at the Royal Melbourne Hospital in Parkville, Victoria from the head injuries he sustained from an altercation at St Kilda on Saturday, 30 July 1949.

Notes

References

External links 
 
 
 John J. Lewis at findagrave.com.

1909 births
1949 deaths
Australian rules footballers from Melbourne
North Melbourne Football Club players
Australian murder victims
People murdered in Victoria (Australia)
Male murder victims
Neurological disease deaths in Victoria (Australia)
People from Carlton, Victoria